Dana Pyritz (born 31 August 1970 in Kühlungsborn) is a German rower.

References 
 
 

1970 births
Living people
German female rowers
Rowers at the 1992 Summer Olympics
Rowers at the 1996 Summer Olympics
Olympic bronze medalists for Germany
Olympic rowers of Germany
Olympic medalists in rowing
World Rowing Championships medalists for Germany
Medalists at the 1992 Summer Olympics
People from Rostock (district)
20th-century German women
21st-century German women